The EMD GP38  is a four-axle diesel-electric locomotive built by General Motors Electro-Motive Division between January 1966 and December 1971. The locomotive's prime mover was an EMD 645 16-cylinder engine that generated . The company built 706 GP38s for North American railroads.

In 1972, EMD began making an updated model, the GP38-2, as part of its Dash-2 line.

Original orders

Rebuilds

A number of GP38s have been rebuilt into the equivalent of a GP38-2.

Conversely, a number of higher horsepower 40 Series locomotives have been rebuilt into the equivalent of a GP38-2 (GP38AC), by the removal of the turbocharger and the substitution of twin Roots blowers.

In 2007, Norfolk Southern rebuilt #2911 which is an ex Penn Central GP38 into an experimental zero-emissions Battery-Electric locomotive known as the Altoona Works BP4. The new locomotive was renumbered as NS #999.

Preservation

Conway Scenic Railroad 252, built as Maine Central 252, is in Maine Central ‘harvest gold’ paint with Conway Scenic reporting marks, and currently operates on excursions on the former MEC Notch Route. This locomotive suffered a broken crankshaft in August 2020 and has since been repaired.
Conway Scenic Railroad 255, built as Maine Central 255, is in Vermont Railway Red paint with Conway Scenic reporting marks.
TAG Railway 80 is preserved in operational condition at the Tennessee Valley Railroad Museum.
West Chester Railroad 7706, built as Penn Central 7706, is preserved and operates on tourist trains on the former PRR line.
Chessie System 3802, built as Baltimore & Ohio 3802, is preserved at the Baltimore Ohio Railroad Museum in Baltimore, Maryland

See also 
List of GM-EMD locomotives
List of GMD Locomotives

References

 
 
 Sarberenyi, Robert. EMD GP38 and GP38AC Original Owners

External links 

GP38
GP38
B-B locomotives
Diesel-electric locomotives of the United States
Railway locomotives introduced in 1966
Freight locomotives
Standard gauge locomotives of the United States
Standard gauge locomotives of Canada
Standard gauge locomotives of Mexico
Diesel-electric locomotives of Canada
Diesel-electric locomotives of Mexico